Ralph Darwin Miller (March 15, 1873 – May 7, 1973) was an American right-handed pitcher in Major League Baseball who played for the Brooklyn Bridegrooms and Baltimore Orioles during the 1898 and 1899 baseball seasons. Born in Cincinnati, he died there at age 100; he was the first major league player to live to his 100th birthday.  At the time of his death he was believed to be the last surviving 19th century Major Leaguer, a title which he unofficially held until the 1990s when baseball researchers discovered that Charlie Emig, a pitcher who played in one game in 1896 and died in 1975, held that distinction.

See also
List of centenarians (Major League Baseball players)
List of centenarians (sportspeople)

References

External links

1873 births
1973 deaths
Major League Baseball pitchers
Brooklyn Bridegrooms players
Baltimore Orioles (NL) players
Baseball players from Cincinnati
American centenarians
Men centenarians
19th-century baseball players
Kenton Babes players
Jackson Wolverines players
Fall River Indians players
Worcester Farmers players
Hartford Indians players
Wooden Nutmegs players
Indianapolis Indians players
Milwaukee Brewers (minor league) players
St. Paul Saints (AA) players